Gerhard Sigvald Pedersen (April 9, 1912 – June 4, 1987) was a Danish boxer who competed in the 1936 Summer Olympics.

In 1936 he won the bronze medal in the welterweight class after winning the third-place fight against Roger Tritz of France.

1936 Olympic results
Below are the results of Gerhard Pedersen, a Danish boxer who competed in the welterweight division at the 1936 Berlin Olympics:

 Round of 32: defeated Enrique Giaverni (Chile) on points
 Round of 16: defeated Rudolf Andreassen (Norway) on points
 Quarterfinal: defeated Raul Rodriguez (Argentina) on points
 Semifinal: lost to Sten Suvio (Finland) on points 
 Bronze Medal Bout: defeated Roger Tritz (France) on points (won bronze medal)

References
 profile

External links

1912 births
1987 deaths
Welterweight boxers
Olympic boxers of Denmark
Boxers at the 1936 Summer Olympics
Olympic bronze medalists for Denmark
Olympic medalists in boxing
Danish male boxers
Medalists at the 1936 Summer Olympics